Local elections were held in Northern Ireland on Thursday 2 May 2019. The last elections were held in 2014. 819 candidates contested 462 seats across Northern Ireland's 11 local government districts. 1,305,384 people aged 18 and over were eligible to vote, and 52.7% of the electorate turned out.

Electoral system
Northern Ireland uses the Single Transferable Vote (STV) system to elect members of local councils and members of the Northern Ireland Assembly. Voters rank candidates in order of preference by marking 1, 2, 3, etc. to the names of candidates on a ballot paper and can rank as many or as few candidates as they like or just vote for one candidate. These were the second elections held on new boundaries, introduced in 2014.

These were the first Northern Ireland elections at which people have been able to register to vote online.

Background
The Northern Ireland Assembly had been suspended since 2017 with the failure of powersharing between the DUP and Sinn Féin. However, in March 2019, the Secretary of State for Northern Ireland Karen Bradley stated that, after the local elections, the government wished to revive Assembly talks. At the 2017 United Kingdom general election, no party won an overall majority in the UK Parliament, so the DUP agreed a deal to support a minority Conservative government. UK politics was dominated by Brexit, which was due to take place before the local elections, however it was delayed until 31 January 2020.

All the parties with elected councillors from the last elections are running again, including the major parties of the Democratic Unionist Party (DUP), Sinn Féin, Ulster Unionist Party (UUP), Social Democratic and Labour Party (SDLP) and Alliance Party of Northern Ireland. The SDLP and Fianna Fáil held talks about running a joint campaign for the May 2019 local elections, with the possibility of the SDLP merging into Fianna Fáil. There was division within the membership of the SDLP as to what form of relationship to have between the two parties. The two parties announced a partnership agreement in January 2019 rather than a full merger. In February 2019, both party leaders criticised the DUP and Sinn Féin over the continuing deadlock over power sharing in the Assembly.

Aontú is a new party, an anti-abortion splinter from Sinn Féin, launched in January 2019. By February 2019, it had two councillors in Northern Ireland, one defecting from the SDLP and a second from Sinn Féin. The party nominated 16 candidates across 7 of the 11 local councils.

Candidates
819 candidates stood, compared to 905 at the previous elections. The DUP fielded 172, Sinn Féin 155, the UUP 117, the SDLP 85 and Alliance 84. Others standing include the Green Party Northern Ireland, TUV, People Before Profit Alliance, The Workers Party, Progressive Unionist Party, Cross-Community Labour Alternative, Aontú, NI Conservatives, UKIP and several independents.

Results
Paralleling results in England, Alliance, some smaller parties and independents made significant gains. The largest nationalist party, Sinn Féin, returned the same number of councillors as in 2014. The DUP, UUP and SDLP all saw losses. The TUV saw significant losses and UKIP and NI21 lost all of their seats in the region, while Aontú and Cross-Community Labour Alternative won their first seats and there were gains by People Before Profit and the Greens.

Results by council

Results by party

Councils

Antrim and Newtownabbey

Ards and North Down

Armagh, Banbridge and Craigavon

Belfast

Causeway Coast and Glens

Derry and Strabane

Fermanagh and Omagh

Lisburn and Castlereagh

Mid and East Antrim

Mid Ulster

Newry, Mourne and Down

Footnotes

See also
2019 United Kingdom local elections

References 

 
2019
2019 in Northern Ireland